Gerhart von Schulze-Gävernitz (born 25 July 1864 in Breslau; died 10 July 1943 in Krainsdorf) was a German economist.

Biography
He became professor at Freiburg in 1893, and at Heidelberg in 1896, and then returned to Freiburg. After his retirement, he became a Quaker.

Works
 Zum sozialen Frieden (Toward a peaceful society; 1890)
 Grossbetrieb (Large operations; 1892)
 Thomas Carlyles Welt- und Lebensanschauung (Thomas Carlyles view of life and the world; 1893)
 Volkswirtschaftliche Studien aus Russland (Political economic studies from Russia; 1899)
 Britischer Iperialismus und enqlischer Freihandel zu Beginn des 20-ten Jahrhunderis(British Imperialism and English Free Market at the beginnings of 20th century;1906)
 Democracy and religion. A Study in Quakerism (1931)

Family
His son, Gero von Schulze-Gaevernitz, was also an economist.

Further reading
  (subscription required)

Notes

References

External links
 

1864 births
1943 deaths
Writers from Wrocław
People from the Province of Silesia
Converts to Quakerism
German Quakers
German People's Party (1868) politicians
Progressive People's Party (Germany) politicians
German Democratic Party politicians
Members of the 13th Reichstag of the German Empire
Members of the Weimar National Assembly
German economists
Academic staff of the University of Freiburg
Academic staff of Heidelberg University